Magdalena Banecka (born 11 February 1980) is a Polish volleyball player who played in the Polish Women's Volleyball League.

Playing career 
She participated at the 2011–12 Women's CEV Cup, with BKS Bielsko-Biała.

Clubs

References

External links 

 http://www.cev.lu/Competition-Area/PlayerDetails.aspx?TeamID=7639&PlayerID=25987&ID=552
 http://siatkowka.bks.bielsko.pl/news/pl/2011/11/08/362/
 http://sport.gwar.pl/szukaj/sport/magdalena-banecka

1980 births
Living people
Polish women's volleyball players